The British Rail Class 555 METRO is a new class of electric multiple unit, manufactured by Swiss company Stadler Rail, that will enter into service in 2023 on the Tyne and Wear Metro. It will replace the original Tyne and Wear Metrocar rolling stock, which have been in use since 1980. To facilitate operation of the Class 555, a new Metro Fleet Depot in Gosforth has been built, and 40 of the 60 stations are having platform heights modified. Operator Nexus has consulted with both drivers and passengers on the fine details of cab and carriage interior design. Costing a total of £362million, the first of the 46 units are expected to enter into service in Autumn 2023.

Selection
In 2016, the Metro operator Nexus, announced a consultation to determine the views of its customers in the design of its planned new fleet of trains. At the time, the operator had completed a life-extending refurbishment on its existing fleet that was intended to take it up to its planned life-expiry date, which was estimated for the early to mid 2020s. Following this consultation, Nexus began the procurement process to purchase a new fleet of trains, with its initial proposal for a total of 42 units, each of five cars, to replace the 89 existing sets, with an option to order another four units to cope with passenger demand.

In January 2020, Nexus selected Stadler Rail's Metro platform as the basis for its new trains. Two months later, Nexus received funding for an additional four units, taking the total up to 46.

Construction and commissioning

Construction of the first Class 555 units is scheduled to begin in August 2021, with delivery planned for the first unit to be delivered in November 2022 for testing and commissioning around the Metro network. Two units will be extensively tested at a test track, based in Velim in the Czech Republic. The first commissioned unit is due to enter the service in July 2023.

In December 2021, Nexus revealed that the Metro fleet had entered the final assembly phase at Stadler’s factory in Switzerland and that the manufacturer is in the process of fitting the main interior components of the first of the new trains. The works include the installation of wheels, seats, equipment cases, piping, wiring, flooring, windows and other internal furnishings.

In February 2023, eight Metro drivers attended initial training on the new units on the  Velim test track.
The first of the 46 units, costing £362million, arrived in Tyneside on 28 February 2023, and will undergo compatibility testing across the network before entering into service in the Autumn.

Design
The Class 555 is a variant of Stadler's Metro multiple unit platform, with changes specifically optimised for the Tyne and Wear Metro network. In September 2020, Nexus undertook a second public consultation to ask for opinions on how the interior of the new trains should be designed, related to the seating, grab poles and space for bike racks. At the same time, Nexus' drivers were consulted on the design of their cabs using virtual reality software, and in March 2021, took delivery of a physical cab mock-up built by ROBUR Prototyping in Chemnitz, Germany and shipped to the Gosforth Depot. A cab consultation period was carried out between March and April 2021 with over 200 operational staff taking part. Unlike the previous fleet, which had only a half-width driver's cab at each end, with the other half occupied by passenger seating, the new units will have a full-width driving position.

The new trains will be five cars long in fixed formations, with a Jacobs bogie between the inner cars. One centre car will be fitted with a Brecknell Willis pantograph to draw the power from the  overhead lines. They will also be fitted with regenerative braking technology for greater energy efficiency, and a battery energy storage system that will allow the trains to remain powered and reach the nearest station if the overhead lines fail. This offers the potential to be used on routes that are not fitted with overhead lines that may be added to the network in the future.

The trains will feature specially designed retractable steps at the doors, which are designed to bridge the gap between the train and the platform. They will have an overall capacity of 600 persons, with 104 seats, specially designed easy access areas and have state-of-the-art CCTV, a new passenger information system, USB charging points and (for the first time on Tyne and Wear Metro) air conditioning throughout the saloon.

Infrastructure upgrades

To facilitate the delivery of the new fleet, Nexus has commissioned work to replace or modify several aspects of the network. 
These have included the total demolition and rebuilding of the Metro Fleet Depot in Gosforth, requiring construction of a new temporary depot at Howdon to provide alternative stabling and maintenance facilities whilst Gosforth Depot is rebuilt.
Raising or lowering the track at 40 of the network's 60 stations to facilitate use of the new door system is required, costing a total of £2million. This work was started in October 2020.

References

External links

555
Electric multiple units of Great Britain
Stadler Rail multiple units
Tyne and Wear Metro
1500 V DC multiple units